CR1 or CR-1 may refer to:

Vehicles

Aircraft
 Cessna CR-1, an American air racer
 Fiat CR.1, a 1920s Italian biplane fighter aircraft

Automobiles
 Climax CR1, a 2015 British sports car
 Aquila CR1, a 2008–present Danish race car

Other uses
 Complement receptor 1, a protein
 CR-1 visa, a United States immigrant visa that allows a spouse of a US citizen to enter as a conditional permanent resident
 CR-1 gene is about Teratocarcinoma-derived growth factor 1